Group of Bears is a sculpture by Paul Manship. The 1932 bronze sculpture in the Metropolitan Museum of Art's collection was cast in 1933 and measures 88 x 72 x 56 inches. The bronze sculpture at Pat Hoffman Friedman Playground, in Central Park, at Fifth Avenue and 79th Street, was cast in 1960 and unveiled on October 11, 1990. Other versions of the piece are featured on part of the William Church Osborn Gates (1952) and the Paul J. Rainey Memorial Gates (1933) at the Bronx Zoo.  Another cast of the work from 2008 can be found in Compton Gardens, in Bentonville, Arkansas.

See also

 1932 in art

References

External links
 

Animal sculptures in the United States
Bronze sculptures in New York City
Metalwork of the Metropolitan Museum of Art
Outdoor sculptures in New York City
Outdoor sculptures in Manhattan
Sculptures of the Metropolitan Museum of Art
Statues in New York City
Sculptures in Arkansas
Sculptures of bears
Works by Paul Manship
Central Park